Kaprada is one of the 182 Legislative Assembly constituencies of Gujarat state in India. It is part of Valsad district and is reserved for candidates belonging to the Scheduled Tribes. It came into existence after 2008 delimitation. Before it was come under Mota Pondha seat.

List of segments
This assembly seat represents the following segments,

 Kaprada Taluka
 Pardi Taluka (Part) Villages – Sonwada, Varai, Nimkhal, Panchlai, Lakhmapor, Nevri, Rabdi, Asma, Tarmaliya, Rohina, Samarpada, Dhagadmal, Daheli, Chival, Arnala, Pati, Goima, Barai, Dumalav, Ambach, Kherlav, Pandor, Rata, Kocharva, Vankachh, Koparli, Kaval, Karaya, Nani Tambadi, Degam, Moti Tambadi, Lavachha, Karamkhal, Chibhad Kachchh

Member of legislative assembly

Election results

2022

2020 By-poll

2017

2012

See also
 List of constituencies of Gujarat Legislative Assembly
 Gujarat Legislative Assembly

References

External links
 

Assembly constituencies of Gujarat
Valsad district